The 1919 West Tennessee State Normal football team was an American football team that represented West Tennessee State Normal School (now known as the University of Memphis) as an independent during the 1919 college football season. This was the first year of head coach V. M. Campbell's second stint as head coach. West Tennessee State Normal compiled a 3–4 record.

Schedule

References

West Tennessee State Normal
Memphis Tigers football seasons
West Tennessee State Normal football